Nikitinka is a rural locality (a village) in Sukkulovsky Selsoviet, Yermekeyevsky District, Bashkortostan, Russia. The population was 6 as of 2010. There is 1 street.

Geography 
Nikitinka is located 26 km north of Yermekeyevo (the district's administrative centre) by road. Mikhaylovka is the nearest rural locality.

References 

Rural localities in Yermekeyevsky District